Karla Cornejo Villavicencio (born 1989) is an Ecuadorian-American writer and the author of The Undocumented Americans (2020). She has written about her experiences as an undocumented immigrant from Ecuador to the United States. In October 2020 it was shortlisted for the National Book Award for Nonfiction.

Early life and education 
Cornejo Villavicencio was born in 1989 in Ecuador. When she was 18 months old, her parents left her behind when they immigrated to the US. When she was four or five, her parents brought her to the United States. She has a brother. The family lived in the New York borough of Queens.

She graduated from Harvard in 2011 and believes she is one of the first undocumented immigrants to do so. As of September 2020 she is a PhD candidate in the American studies program at Yale. She was an Emerson Collective fellow.

Career 
Cornejo Villavicencio began writing professionally as a teenager. She reviewed jazz albums for a New York monthly magazine. She has written for The Atlantic, Elle, Glamour, n+1, The New Republic, The New York Times, and Vogue.

The Undocumented Americans

In 2010, when Cornejo Villavicencio was a senior in college and before Deferred Action for Childhood Arrivals (DACA) program was established, she wrote an essay, “I'm an Illegal Immigrant at Harvard”, which was published anonymously by the Daily Beast. Literary agents reached out to ask if she'd be interested in writing a memoir, which she says made her angry, as she was at the time 21. She felt most were interested in having her write "a rueful tale about a sickly Victorian orphan with tuberculosis who didn't have a social security number".

Cornejo Villavicencio's first book, The Undocumented Americans, is part memoir, part essays about undocumented day laborers, whom she calls "People who don't inspire hashtags or t-shirts". She started writing it the morning after the 2016 presidential election and says she "thought the moment called for a radical experiment in genre". She has said she wasn't interested in writing about DACA recipients, as the stories of DACA recipients are already well-documented and "occupy outsize attention in our politics". Cornejo Villavicencio visited with workers in Cleveland, Flint, New Haven, New York, and Miami, "gaining access to vigilantly guarded communities whose stories are largely absent from modern journalism and literature". She in general avoided detailing her subjects' reasons for emigrating because she believes people shouldn't have to provide a reason why they "deserve" to emigrate.

Cornejo Villavicencio built trust slowly within the communities of undocumented immigrants, helped by her own undocumented status and her fluency in Spanish, taking notes by hand instead of relying on a tape recorder. After the book was completed she destroyed her notes. She changed the names and any personal details that could be used to identify the subjects. The book is dedicated to Claudia Gomez Gonzalez, an undocumented immigrant who was killed by border agents shortly after crossing the Mexican border.

Shereen Marisol Meraji says the book "profiles people who've paid a steep price for the so-called American Dream". Cornejo Villavicencio had originally written the book as her dissertation at Yale; when she presented it, it was failed, she believes because she "criticized the legacy of migration studies, where I found a fixation on brown skin, on calloused hands". She places the book in the Latin American literary genre testimonio.

In 2020 during the coronavirus pandemic, she wrote a piece for The New York Times about the humanitarian crisis on the US–Mexico border.

Reception 
Remezcla called The Undocumented Americans a "creative non-fiction masterpiece". The Adroit Journal called her writing style "very precise and also casual, almost nonchalant". Guernica said "Her prose—caustic, quick, and simmering with righteous anger—leads seamlessly from heartbreak to gut-splitting laughter". Bookforum said "The book is beautiful for Cornejo Villavicencio's sensitivity to character, and for her ability to structure a narrative almost entirely through the people she meets." Caitlin Dickerson, writing for The New York Times, called the book "captivating and evocative". Publishers Weekly called it "profoundly intimate" and an "incandescent account". Kirkus Reviews points out that because any identifiable details have been changed, the reader has to trust that Cornejo Villavicencio hasn't embellished, but notes her "candor about herself removes worries about the credibility of her stories". The Harvard Crimson said that her point is that "Undocumented people need not be 'heroes' for their stories to be important, valid, and, above all, told." Daisy Muñoz, writing for the LatinX Project at New York University, said "Cornejo’s storytelling flawlessly goes from her experiences to those of her interviewees, all the while weaving everyone’s histories into a compassionate and nuanced narrative of what it means to live an undocumented life". ElectricLiterature said it "doesn't pander to white expectations". The Common called it "heavy and gorgeous and astoundingly humane". Smithsonian gave it a starred review. It has been shortlisted for the 2020 National Book Award for Nonfiction; according to the National Book Foundation she is the first undocumented writer to be a finalist.

As of October 2020, she is no longer an undocumented resident, having gained a green card and establishing permanent residence in New Haven.

Personal life 
Cornejo Villavicencio lives with her partner, Talya Zemach-Bersin, in New Haven.

References 

1989 births
Living people
DACA recipients
Ecuadorian emigrants to the United States
Harvard University alumni
The New Yorker people
People from New Haven, Connecticut
Undocumented immigrants to the United States
Writers from Queens, New York
Yale Graduate School of Arts and Sciences alumni